Marjan Dema (born May 27, 1957 in Klina, FPR Yugoslavia) is a professor of mathematics. He was involved for many years in the Balkan Universities Network and since March 2016 he is Rector of the University of Pristina

Biography 
Marjan Dema earned a master's degree in Mathematics with the thesis "Some interpolation features of analytical functions within the Hilbert transform and Doctor of Mathematical Sciences in 1987 with the work Multiple interpolation in HP premises, at the University of Pristina.

He has taught as visiting professor at the Faculty of Economics of the University of Tetova (1997-1999) and at the American College "Midwestern Baptist College" in Pontiac, United States (2002-2005).  He has scientific connections within the framework of the Balkan Universities Network to the Trakya University in Edirne and especially with Hilmi Ibar.

In the years 2009-2012 he was a member of the University Council of the University of Pristina. After his election as Rector of the University of Pristina, he took office in March 2016.

In 2019, Rector Dema was the patron of an international seminar hosted by Rotary International with students from Germany, Greece, Turkey and Kosovo on the subject of malaria control.

References

External links 
 Webpage of the University Pristina
 Webpage of Rektor Marjan Dema
 Marjan Dema on Researchgate
 Marjan Dema in Berkleycenter
 Marjan Dema Member of DAAAM
 Marjan Dema on USAID

Literature 
 Marjan Dema opening speech in: Manfred G. Raupp und Wolfgang Uebel: The fight against Malaria and other related mosquito-born Diseases, Results and proposed next Steps of the Rotary Seminar at the University Prishtina (Kosovo) 2019: Publisher: madora gmbh Lörrach & Lörrach International e.V. Mai 2019, 

Living people
1957 births
Albanian mathematicians
University of Pristina alumni
Academic staff of the University of Pristina